Alvin Jones may refer to:
Alvin Jones (basketball) (born 1978), Luxembourgian-American professional basketball player
Alvin Jones (American football) (born 1994), American football linebacker
Alvin Jones (footballer) (born 1994), Trinidadian association football player
Alvin Jones (ice hockey) (1917–2007), Canadian professional ice hockey player
Alvin Jones (musician), American trombonist best known for his work with The Gap Band